Saponins (Latin "sapon", soap + "-in", one of), also selectively referred to as triterpene glycosides, are bitter-tasting usually toxic plant-derived organic chemicals that have a foamy quality when agitated in water. They are widely distributed but found particularly in soapwort (genus Saponaria), a flowering plant, the soapbark tree (Quillaja saponaria) and soybeans (Glycine max L.). They are used in soaps, medicines, fire extinguishers, speciously as dietary supplements, for synthesis of steroids, and in carbonated beverages (for example, being responsible for maintaining the head on root beer). Structurally, they are glycosides, sugars bonded to another organic molecule, usually a steroid or triterpene, a steroid building block. Saponins are both water and fat soluble, which gives them their useful soap properties. Some examples of these chemicals are glycyrrhizin (licorice flavoring) and quillaia (alt. quillaja), a bark extract used in beverages.

Uses
The saponins are a subclass of terpenoids, the largest class of plant extracts. The amphipathic nature of saponins gives them activity as surfactants with potential ability to interact with cell membrane components, such as cholesterol and phospholipids, possibly making saponins useful for development of cosmetics and drugs. Saponins have also been used as adjuvants in development of vaccines, such as Quil A, an extract from the bark of Quillaja saponaria. This makes them of interest for possible use in subunit vaccines and vaccines directed against intracellular pathogens. In their use as adjuvants for manufacturing vaccines, toxicity associated with sterol complexation remains a concern.

While saponins are promoted commercially as dietary supplements and are used in traditional medicine, there is no high-quality clinical evidence that they have any beneficial effect on human health. Quillaja is toxic when consumed in large amounts, involving possible liver damage, gastric pain, diarrhea, or other adverse effects.

Saponins are used for their effects on ammonia emissions in animal feeding. In the United States, researchers are exploring the use of saponins derived from plants to control invasive worm species, including the jumping worm.

Saponins exhibit antioxidant potential in brain mitochondria.

Biological functions 
Saponins have hypolipidemic properties as they reduce cholesterol and low density lipoprotein levels and may be helpful in the treatment of dyslipidemia.

Saponins exhibit cytotoxic effect on cancer cells through induction of apoptosis. They also have chemotherapeutic properties as they have mechanisms that control protein expression linked to cell cycle, cancer progression and metastasis.

The antidiabetic effects of saponins have been extensively reported, with saponins being identified as an antidiabetic principle from medicinal plants. Several mechanisms have been proposed for the antidiabetic properties of saponins which include, activation of Peroxisome proliferator-activated receptors gamma (PPARγ), activation of Glucose transporter type 4 (Glut4), Activation of adiponectin expression, Activation of PI3K/Akt Pathway, increase in expression of adipsin and activation of AMP-activated protein kinase (AMPK).

Decoction
The principal historical use of these plants was boiling down to make soap. Saponaria officinalis is most suited for this procedure, but other related species also work. The greatest concentration of saponin occurs during flowering, with the most saponin found in the woody stems and roots, but the leaves also contain some.

Sources
Saponins have historically been plant-derived, but they have also been isolated from marine organisms such as sea cucumber. They derive their name from the soapwort plant (genus Saponaria, family Caryophyllaceae), the root of which was used historically as a soap. Saponins are also found in the botanical family Sapindaceae, including its defining genus Sapindus (soapberry or soapnut) and the horse chestnut, and in the closely related families Aceraceae (maples) and Hippocastanaceae. It is also found heavily in Gynostemma pentaphyllum (Cucurbitaceae) in a form called gypenosides, and ginseng or red ginseng (Panax, Araliaceae) in a form called ginsenosides. Saponins are also found in the unripe fruit of Manilkara zapota (also known as sapodillas), resulting in highly astringent properties. Nerium oleander (Apocynaceae), also known as White Oleander, is a source of the potent cardiac toxin oleandrin. Within these families, this class of chemical compounds is found in various parts of the plant: leaves, stems, roots, bulbs, blossom and fruit. Commercial formulations of plant-derived saponins, e.g., from the soap bark tree, Quillaja saponaria, and those from other sources are available via controlled manufacturing processes, which make them of use as chemical and biomedical reagents. Soyasaponins are a group of structurally complex oleanane-type triterpenoid saponins that include soyasapogenol (aglycone) and oligosaccharide moieties biosynthesized on soybean tissues. Soyasaponins were previously associated to plant-microbe interactions from root exudates and abiotic stresses, as nutritional deficiency.

Role in plant ecology and impact on animal foraging 
In plants, saponins may serve as anti-feedants, and to protect the plant against microbes and fungi. Some plant saponins (e.g. from oat and spinach) may enhance nutrient absorption and aid in animal digestion. However, saponins are often bitter to taste, and so can reduce plant palatability (e.g., in livestock feeds), or even imbue them with life-threatening animal toxicity. Some saponins are toxic to cold-blooded organisms and insects at particular concentrations. Further research is needed to define the roles of these natural products in their host organisms, which have been described as "poorly understood" to date.

Ethnobotany
Most saponins, which readily dissolve in water, are poisonous to fish. Therefore, in ethnobotany, they are known for their use by indigenous people in obtaining aquatic food sources. Since prehistoric times, cultures throughout the world have used fish-killing plants, typically containing saponins, for fishing.

Although prohibited by law, fish-poison plants are still widely used by indigenous tribes in Guyana.

On the Indian subcontinent, the Gondi people use poison-plant extracts in fishing.

Many of California's Native American tribes traditionally used soaproot, (genus Chlorogalum) and/or the root of various yucca species, which contain saponin, as a fish poison. They would pulverize the roots, mix with water to generate a foam, then put the suds into a stream. This would kill or incapacitate the fish, which could be gathered easily from the surface of the water. Among the tribes using this technique were the Lassik, the Luiseño, and the Mattole.

Chemical structure

The vast heterogeneity of structures underlying this class of compounds makes generalizations difficult; they're a subclass of terpenoids, oxygenated derivatives of terpene hydrocarbons. Terpenes in turn are formally made up of five-carbon isoprene units. (The alternate steroid base is a terpene missing a few carbon atoms.) Derivatives are formed by substituting other groups for some of the hydrogen atoms of the base structure. In the case of most saponins, one of these substituents is a sugar, so the compound is a glycoside of the base molecule.

More specifically, the lipophilic base structure of a saponin can be a triterpene, a steroid (such as spirostanol or furostanol) or a steroidal alkaloid (in which nitrogen atoms replace one or more carbon atoms). Alternatively, the base structure may be an acyclic carbon chain rather than the ring structure typical of steroids. One or two (rarely three) hydrophilic monosaccharide (simple sugar) units bind to the base structure via their hydroxyl (OH) groups. In some cases other substituents are present, such as carbon chains bearing hydroxyl or carboxyl groups. Such chain structures may be 1-11 carbon atoms long, but are usually 2–5 carbons long; the carbon chains themselves may be branched or unbranched.

The most commonly encountered sugars are monosaccharides like glucose and galactose, though a wide variety of sugars occurs naturally. Other kinds of molecules such as organic acids may also attach to the base, by forming esters via their carboxyl (COOH) groups. Of particular note among these are sugar acids such as glucuronic acid and galacturonic acid, which are oxidized forms of glucose and galactose.

See also 
 Cardenolide
 Cardiac glycoside
 Phytochemical

References

 
Saponaceous plants